R312 road may refer to:
 R312 road (Ireland)
 R312 road (South Africa)